Mizin in Iran may refer to:
 Mizin, Ardabil
 Mizin, Kurdistan